Keith John Cullen (born 13 June 1972 in Ilford, Greater London) is a male former long-distance runner from England.

Athletics career
Cullen represented Great Britain at the 2000 Summer Olympics in the men's marathon. He finished in 19th place, clocking 2:16:59. Four years earlier, in Atlanta, United States, he was eliminated in the semi-finals of the men's 3000 metres steeplechase. He represented England in the 5,000 metres event, at the 1998 Commonwealth Games in Kuala Lumpur, Malaysia.

Personal life
He is now a Graphic Designer living in North London.

Achievements

References

 

1972 births
Living people
English male middle-distance runners
English male long-distance runners
English male steeplechase runners
Athletes (track and field) at the 1996 Summer Olympics
Athletes (track and field) at the 2000 Summer Olympics
Olympic athletes of Great Britain
Athletes (track and field) at the 1998 Commonwealth Games
Commonwealth Games competitors for England